Heritage High School is a public four year high school located in Wake Forest, North Carolina. A part of the Wake County Public School System, Heritage High School is home to over 1,900 students  in 9th–12th grade.

History

Heritage High School opened in 2010 in response to rapid population growth throughout Wake Forest. During the 2009–2010 school year, the campus was used by the students and staff of Wake Forest-Rolesville High School while their campus underwent renovations. When Heritage opened, educators from a variety of surrounding high schools were brought in, including former Wakefield High School principal Mark Savage. 

When Heritage first opened, it was only occupied by students in 9th and 10th grades. In this first year, Heritage trotted out varsity teams in every sport with the exception of football. In the 2011–2012 school year, the building was three-fourths occupied due to the addition of another freshman class. The school was finally filled with all four classes in the 2012–2013 school year. The 2012–2013 year also marked Heritage's first-ever graduating class.

On July 19, 2016 the Wake County Public School System announced that Heritage principle Mark Savage would be promoted to the Western Area Superintendent and former Enloe principal, Scott Lyons would be moved to Heritage to become the school's second principal.

Early accolades

After the first graduating class, Mark Savage was named WCPSS Principal of the Year in 2013, an impressive accomplishment for a new high school. The following year, Heritage teacher Allison Reid was named the Wake County Teacher of the Year for her outstanding ability to integrate technology into instruction. In 2016, Miles Macleod, another Heritage educator, was named Wake County Teacher of the Year for his work in establishing a culture of service and global knowledge at the school through the creation of Project Wisdom organization. Heritage became the first Wake County school to ever have two different educators win the award in three years.

Athletics

As a public high school, Heritage is a member of the North Carolina High School Athletic Association. Due to its large population, Heritage is classified into the 4A division, the highest classification. Ever since opening in 2010, Heritage has been a member of the CAP-8 conference, a Raleigh-based conference made entirely up of 4A schools. In May 2016, the NCHSAA passed a new set of conferences that, when placed into effect for the 2017–18 school year, moves Heritage into the Northern Athletic Conference, which is made up of six 4A schools to the east of Raleigh. Until then, Heritage will remain in the CAP-8 for one more season.

Sports teams

 Baseball 
 Basketball (men's and women's)
 Cheerleading (men's and women's)
 Cross country (men's and women's)
 Football 
 Golf (men's and women's)
 Lacrosse (men's and women's)
 Soccer (men's and women's)
 Softball
 Swimming (men's and women's)
 Stunt 
 Track and field (indoor and outdoor; men's and women's)
 Tennis (men's and women's)
 Volleyball
 Wrestling

Conference championships
Softball: 2015 (co-champions), 2016
Women's Golf: 2013, 2014, 2019
Men's Diving: 2018, 2019

State championships
Cheerleading: 2015–16, 2016–17 (Division 1)
Women's Soccer: 2018–2019

School organizations

Notable student organizations include: Fellowship of Christian Athletes, Science Olympiad, Gay-Straight Alliance, Environmental Club, Key Club, National Achievers Society, Art Club, International Club,  National Honor Society. Other clubs include various honor societies, community outreach programs, extracurricular foreign-language and culture clubs (French, Spanish, and American Sign Language), and athletic boosters.

Hooligans

The Hooligans are an award-winning student section. Named after their behavior, the Hooligans are widely known to be some of the most rambunctious fans in North Carolina high school sports. Operating out of Heritage High School's Spirit Club, the Hooligans are the only student section to win HighSchoolOT.com's "Student Section Showdown" in back-to-back years (2013 and 2014).

Theatre 
The program has put on numerous productions every semester.

References

External links
 

Wake County Public School System
Public high schools in North Carolina
Schools in Wake County, North Carolina
Wake Forest, North Carolina
2010 establishments in North Carolina